Igor Davydov (born 25 January 1966) is a Soviet field hockey player. He competed in the men's tournament at the 1988 Summer Olympics.

References

External links
 

1966 births
Living people
Soviet male field hockey players
Olympic field hockey players of the Soviet Union
Field hockey players at the 1988 Summer Olympics
Place of birth missing (living people)